Judson Crews (June 30, 1917 – May 17, 2010) was an American poet, bookseller and small press publisher.

Early life 
Crews was born and raised in Waco, Texas. Crews earned a Bachelor of Arts and Master of Arts in sociology from Baylor University. He also did postgraduate work at the University of Texas at El Paso.

Career 
Crews worked as an educator at the Wharton County Junior College and the University of New Mexico branch campus in Gallup, New Mexico.

He first opened his Motive Bookshop and issued his first Motive Press publications in Waco. In 1947 he moved both businesses to Taos, New Mexico and married Taos photographer Mildred Tolbert. In addition to writing poetry, his activities in Taos over several decades included editing the poetry magazines Suck-egg Mule, The Deer and Dachshund, The Flying Fish, Motive, Vers Libre, Poetry Taos and The Naked Ear (which published poetry by Robert Creeley, Charles Bukowski, Kenneth L. Beaudoin, Stuart Z. Perkoff, Vincent Ferrini, Larry Eigner, LeRoi Jones (Amiri Baraka), Jack Anderson and Diane Di Prima, among others); and issuing chapbooks of his own poetry and poetry by his friends Wendell Anderson and Carol Bergé. Crews was a frequent contributor to Poetry, among many other literary journals. Besides operating his bookshop and press, he worked in newspaper production, as a teacher (including as a lecturer at the University of Zambia, 1974–1978), and as a social worker and counselor, until his retirement.

Crews wrote and published under a number of pseudonyms, including Cerise Farallon, Willard Emory Betis, Trumbull Drachler, Tobi Macadams and Charley John Greasybear. Although he denied it, many in his literary circle believe that "Mason Jordan Mason"—a widely published and anthologized African American poet of the 1950s and 60s, recognized by the likes of Amiri Baraka (LeRoi Jones) and Langston Hughes—was another of Crews's carefully constructed literary personae.

Crews was a friend of novelist Henry Miller, and the two briefly lived together in Big Sur. Crews was a lifelong activist against censorship in publishing.

Much of his own output as an independent, small press publisher consisted of short-run, inexpensively produced literary chapbooks and magazines, making him a notable figure in the 1960s-70s movement known as the Mimeo Revolution.

Personal life 
He died on May 17, 2010 in Taos, New Mexico and is buried in Tres Orejas. Crews had two daughters, artist and author Carole Crews, and photographer Anna Bush Crews.

Bibliography
The Southern Temper (Waco, TX, 1946)
No is the Night (Taos, NM, 1949)
Patrocinio Barela, Taos Wood Carver (with Wendell B. Anderson and Mildred Crews, Taos, NM, 1955)
Inwade to Briney Garth (Taos, NM, 1960)
A Unicorn When Needs Be (Taos, NM, 1963)
Selected Poems (Cleveland, OH, 1964)
Three on a Match (with Wendell B. Anderson and "Cerise Farallon," Taos, NM, 1966)
Nolo Contendere (Houston, TX, 1978)
Songs (as "Charley John Greasybear," Boise, ID, 1979
The Noose, A Retrospective: 4 Decades (Duende/Tooth of Time, Placitas, NM, 1980)
The Clock of Moss (Boise, ID, 1983)
Against All Wounds (Parkdale, OR, 1987)
Dolores Herrera/Nations and Peoples (Las Cruces, NM, 1991)
The Brave Wild Coast: A Year with Henry Miller (Los Angeles, 1997) This autobiographic narrative takes us from the fleshpots of LA bussing to bleak cliffsides over a raging ocean.

References

External links
Taos News obituary
Judson Crews' Papers 1935 - 1981 at the Harry Ransom Center at The University of Texas at Austin
Judson Crews Papers 1936-1961 at the UCLA Special Collection, Young (Charles E.) Research Library
Judson C. Crews Papers 1945-1987 at the University of New Mexico, University Libraries, Center for Southwest Research, Albuquerque, NM
Mark Weber, "The Judson Crews I Know"
Judson Crews Papers. Yale Collection of American Literature, Beinecke Rare Book and Manuscript Library.

1917 births
2010 deaths
American book publishers (people)
American male poets
Baylor University alumni
People from Waco, Texas
Poets from New Mexico
Poets from Texas
Writers from Taos, New Mexico
20th-century American poets
20th-century American male writers